Adetus inca is a species of beetle in the family Cerambycidae. It was described by Martins and Galileo in 2005.

References

Adetus
Beetles described in 2005